The Indian Wireless Telegraph Rules governs the use of wireless devices in India. The act was first drafted in 1949, and then in 1973. It also incorporates clauses from the Indian Telegraph Act, 1885.

References
Indian Wireless Telegraph Rules, 1973 (.doc)

Law of India
Amateur radio in India
1973 in law
Telecommunications law